Thieleherpia is a genus of solenogasters, shell-less, worm-like,  marine  mollusks.

Species
 Thieleherpia thulensis (Thiele, 1900)

References

External links
 Salvini-Plawen, L. (2004). Contributions to the morphological diversity and classification of the order Cavibelonia (Mollusca: Solenogastres. Journal of Molluscan Studies. 70: 73-93.

Solenogastres